The IEEE International Symposium on Information Theory (ISIT) is the flagship meeting of the IEEE Information Theory Society. Every year and during the course of a week, researchers in the field of information theory gather to share their work in a series of presentations. The main event of the symposium is the Shannon Lecture, which is given by the recipient of the prestigious Claude E. Shannon Award of the year; the year's awardee was revealed during the previous ISIT.

History 
The first meeting took place in 1950, although back then it was only called "Information Theory". Claude Shannon was a major participant; he had published his seminal work A Mathematical Theory of Communication only two years before this meeting.

The symposium was held sporadically in the beginning and it has become a yearly event only after the turn of the millennium.

Conferences

References 

IEEE conferences